Uncovered is the third studio album by German DJ and record producer Robin Schulz, it was released on 8 September 2017. The album includes the singles "Shed a Light", "OK", "I Believe I'm Fine", "Unforgettable" and "Oh Child". The album peaked at number eleven on the German Albums Chart.

Singles
"Shed a Light" was released as the lead single from the album on 25 November 2016. The song peaked at number six on the German Singles Chart. "OK" was released as the second single from the album on 19 May 2017. The song peaked at number two on the German Singles Chart. "I Believe I'm Fine" was released as the third single from the album on 8 September 2017. The song peaked at number twenty-nine on the German Singles Chart. "Unforgettable" was released as the fourth single from the album on 22 December 2017. The song peaked at number thirteen on the German Singles Chart. "Oh Child" was released as the fifth single from the album on 22 June 2018. The song peaked at number nineteen on the German Singles Chart.

Critical reception
Robert Wunsch of Billboard gave the album a positive review stating, "It's 18 tracks of mood-altering musical enjoyment, running the gamut of thoughtful pop, energetic dance, folksy tropical rhythms, and cool repose. It opens with a very cinematic 'Intro' that moves smooth into the melancholy chords of 'Unforgettable'. Fans will recognize the fun melody of single 'Shed A Light' featuring fellow pop-dance heroes David Guetta and Cheat Codes, and the easy flow keeps strong into the instantly-catchy 'Oh Child'. Uncovered is full of emotional vocal features, including a powerful performance from soulful up-and-comer IRO on 'Fools', and a big, bright sing-along from radio star James Blunt on 'Okay'".

Track listing

Charts

Release history

References

2017 albums
Robin Schulz albums